KPNW-FM (98.9 MHz "98.9 KPNW") is a commercial radio station in Seattle, Washington. The station is owned by Hubbard Broadcasting and airs an adult album alternative radio format. Hubbard also owns four other radio stations in the Seattle metropolitan area. The studios and offices are located at Newport Corporate Center on 131st Avenue SE in Bellevue.

KPNW-FM's effective radiated power (ERP) is 63,900 watts (68,000 with beam tilt). The transmitter is located in Issaquah on Tiger Mountain. KPNW-FM broadcasts in the HD Radio format. Its HD-2 subchannel carries a sports gambling format, and its HD-3 subchannel simulcasts sister station KKNW.

History

Early years (1958-1972)
In May 1958, the station first signed on as KMCS, owned by Market-Casters, Inc. (hence the call sign). It was then locally owned by former executives with Crown Broadcasting (later to be known as the King Broadcasting Company).

KMCS played popular music and was powered at 10,500 watts, a fraction of its current output. From the late 1960s into the late 1980s, the station operated a sub-carrier 67 kHz subsidiary communications authority (SCA), which transmitted music and point of sale commercials to subscribing restaurants and stores in the Puget Sound area, not available on regular FM receivers. The station switched its call letters to KBBX in 1966.

Easy listening (1972-1983)
KBBX began airing the syndicated easy listening "Music Only For A Woman" format in 1972, supplied by TM. The station also increased its power to 35,000 watts, covering Seattle, Tacoma and adjoining communities. The call letters changed to KEZX. The station's slogan was "Oceans of Beautiful Music".

The SCA was part of the reason that Roy H. Park, owner of Park Broadcasting, purchased the station in late 1975. At the time, Park was one of the largest broadcast companies in the U.S., with many of its stations also airing beautiful music, including WPAT-WPAT-FM in the New York metropolitan area. KEZX increased its power to 100,000 watts in early 1977. Prior to Park's ownership, the station was using the Bellevue-based BPI syndicated beautiful music service. Then, in the spring of 1976, Park made an agreement with Darrel Peters of the "FM 100 Plan" from WLOO in Chicago to go with his beautiful music format. Locally originated programming would return in 1980.

Adult alternative (1983-1990)
By the early 1980s, the easy listening format was beginning to age. In 1983, KEZX flipped to a mix of soft adult contemporary, "West Coast" singer-songwriter music, album oriented rock, and jazz music, a forerunner to today's adult album alternative (AAA) format.

Soft adult contemporary (1990-1993)
KEZX remained as a AAA station until October 15, 1990, when it reverted to soft AC.

Smooth jazz (1993-2010)
In August 1993, KEZX became a smooth jazz outlet, a format that was gaining ground in many major US cities. In October 1995, the station's call sign became KWJZ to complement its smooth jazz format, which had achieved positive ratings in the Seattle-Tacoma radio market. In 1996, KWJZ and co-owned AM 1150 (now KKNW) were sold to Sandusky Broadcasting for $26 million.

With the celebration of the 15th anniversary of KWJZ's format in 2008, the station dropped the "Smooth Jazz" part of its branding and became known simply as "98.9 KWJZ". While smooth jazz still made up the majority of its programming, KWJZ incorporated some chill out music, such as that featured on the syndicated program Chill with Mindi Abair (which aired on Sunday nights on KWJZ), as part of a more broadly defined "smooth music" format.

In the 2000s, KWJZ and other smooth jazz stations began a slow decline in ratings due to changes in Arbitron's measurement system. Portable People Meters (PPM) started being introduced in the Seattle market in late 2008.

Modern adult contemporary (2010-2016)

On December 27, 2010, at 3 pm, KWJZ changed its format to a hybrid of AAA and modern AC as "Click 98.9." Click's first song was "Animal" by Neon Trees. On March 15, 2011, KWJZ changed its call letters to KLCK-FM to reflect its brand name.

Following Mediabase's addition of the station on the alternative rock panel, the station switched to alternative rock in November 2011, though it still leaned toward AAA. Unlike other alternative stations, Click also aired some dance music, such as Martin Solveig's "Hello" and Maroon 5's "Moves Like Jagger." By that December, the station began to include some hot AC material, such as Kelly Clarkson and Daughtry (primarily artists from sister adult contemporary radio station KRWM), but still retained its modern rock direction, reporting to Mediabase's alternative rock panel.

By March 2012, the station switched to hot adult contemporary per Mediabase reports, joining adult top 40 station KPLZ-FM, though KLCK-FM would shift back towards modern AC by mid-2014. In July 2013, Sandusky announced it would sell its radio holdings in Seattle and Phoenix to Hubbard Broadcasting. The sale was completed that November.

During the latter part of the "Click" years, ratings for the station were continually ranked low, averaging about a high 1 to a low 2 share of the Seattle market, as the station was unable to compete against KPLZ, KNDD, KBKS and KYNW. (In the January 2015 Nielsen PPM ratings report for the market, KLCK was ranked No. 19 with a 1.9 share). In addition, the station consistently tweaked its music direction and had a frequent airstaff turnover.

Rock (2016-2017)
On March 11, 2016, at Noon, after playing "Grapevine Fires" by Bellingham band Death Cab for Cutie, KLCK began stunting with a "Wheel of Formats," changing playlists every 6 hours at 6 am, Noon, 6 pm, and Midnight. The formats consisted of all-Frank Sinatra, all-Eagles, all-Garth Brooks, opera/showtunes/musical soundtracks, all-Billy Joel, all-Elvis, all-Red Hot Chili Peppers/Foo Fighters, TV show theme songs, all-Neil Diamond, all-Madonna, all-AC/DC, all-Elton John, all-Beatles, prank phone calls from sister KQMV's morning show "Brooke and Jubal", and all-Led Zeppelin.

There were rumors that the station was planning a format change to all sports as "98.9 The Score" or "Sports 98.9." (A Facebook page was even made for the latter branding, as well as one for "98.9 Real Conservative Radio" to throw speculators off the trail, with the pages taken down shortly after.) The station's website was replaced with quotes from historical figures and lyrics from songs such as The Beatles’ "In My Life," Elvis Presley’s "Heartbreak Hotel" and Garth Brooks’ "Unanswered Prayers," as well as floating question mark bubbles which, when clicked on, either played a female computerized voice soundbite stating "Hey, don't touch that," "What is going on?" "This is strange," or "That tickles"; some clicks would also trigger a Rickroll. In addition, Hubbard requested the call sign KVRQ for the station, which was approved on March 15. Program Director Lisa Adams, morning host Jerry Potter, and midday host Megan Lee all exited with the change.

At Noon on March 16, 2016, KVRQ officially flipped to mainstream rock as "Rock 98-9", with the first song being Nirvana's "In Bloom," part of a 12,000-song, 30-day commercial-free introductory run.

Country (2017-2023)

On December 4, 2017, at 10:44 a.m., KVRQ abruptly dropped the rock format and flipped to country as Country 98-9; the change came after long-time country station KMPS flipped to soft adult contemporary earlier in the morning (after having briefly switched to all-Christmas music upon the completion of CBS Radio's merger with Entercom, the owner of competing country station KKWF). The transition was so abrupt that it was merely the station dropping out in the middle of playing "Otherside" by the Red Hot Chili Peppers, before starting "Greatest Love Story" by Lanco, with the introduction of the new format only coming after the song had ended. The call letters were changed to KNUC on February 6, 2018.

On April 3, 2018, the station rebranded as 98-9 The Bull.

Return to AAA (2023-)
On February 8, 2023, country radio news outlet Country Aircheck and fellow radio news outlet RadioInsight both reported the station had filed with the FCC to change call letters to KPNW-FM effective February 14; the change required consent from Bicoastal Media, owner of KPNW in Eugene, Oregon. Hubbard Seattle VP/Market Manager Trip Reeb told Country Aircheck that the change was connected to the rollout of a new "Country for the PNW" tagline; no such liners were used at the time.

At 9a.m. on February 14, 2023, after concluding that day's broadcast of The Bobby Bones Show and playing "The Cowboy Rides Away" by George Strait, the station, under the new KPNW-FM callsign, flipped back to an adult album alternative format, with David Bowie's "Changes" as the first song; the change put the station in competition with KEXP-FM and KNDD. KPNW-FM is the first commercial AAA station in Seattle since KMTT dropped the format in 2013.

HD Radio
HD1 carries the analog format from the standard 98.9 FM frequency.
HD2 carries a sports betting format, featuring programming from Vegas Stats & Information Network. In January 2023, the channel was rebranded as Tulalip Sportsbook Radio as part of a sponsorship by the Tulalip Resort Casino in Quil Ceda Village.
HD3 carries a simulcast of sister station KKNW.

References

External links
98.9 KPNW website

PNW-FM
Radio stations established in 1958
Hubbard Broadcasting
1958 establishments in Washington (state)
Adult album alternative radio stations in the United States